The NWA International Tag Team Championship is a professional wrestling title, originally created as the NWA Western States Tag Team Championship in the National Wrestling Alliance's Amarillo, Texas territory, Western States Sports. The title was in use from 1969, when it replaced Amarillo's version of the NWA North American Tag Team Championship, through the promotion's 1981 closure. The title was revived on July 15, 2014, by Vendetta Pro Wrestling when they joined the NWA. The Vendetta Pro Wrestling Tag Team Champions at the time, Shane and Shannon Ballard, were recognized as the NWA Western States Tag Team Champions, and since then, the Vendetta Pro Wrestling Tag Team title belts have represented the NWA Western States Tag Team Championship.

On September 30, 2016, The Twisted Sisterz (the team of Holidead and Thunder Rosa) defeated Alexander G. Bernard and Jimi Mayhem for the title to become the first team of women to win the NWA Western States Tag Team Championship.

On October 19, 2016, Vendetta Pro Wrestling awarded temporary, provisional control of the title to joshi puroresu promotion World Wonder Ring Stardom, while the reigning champions were on tour there. The Twisted Sisterz successfully defended the title at Stardom's December 22 Korakuen Hall show.

On December 30, 2016, NWA Director of Operations James Beard announced that the title controlled by Vendetta Pro Wrestling had been renamed the NWA International Tag Team Championship following a title defense in Japan.

As of October 1, 2017, Vendetta Pro Wrestling is no longer directly associated with the NWA following the takeover of Billy Corgan. As such, the 'NWA' International Tag Team Championship is vacated and deactivated. Billy Blade and Richie Slade retained the 'Vendetta Pro Wrestling' International Tag Team Championship.

Names

Title history (1969-1981)
Silver areas in the history indicate periods of unknown lineage. An  indicates that a title changes occurred no later than the listed date.

Title history (since 2014)

See also
List of National Wrestling Alliance championships
NWA North American Tag Team Championship
NWA Western States Heavyweight Championship
NWA International Tag Team Championship

References

National Wrestling Alliance championships
Tag team wrestling championships
Regional professional wrestling championships
Western States Sports championships
World Wonder Ring Stardom championships